Kusum Mehdele (born 15 August 1943) is an Indian politician who is cabinet minister in Government of Madhya Pradesh. She is a leader of the Bharatiya Janata Party and is elected to the assembly from the Panna constituency.
She was a Bharatiya Janata Mahila Morcha thrice from 1984 to 1990 as well as Vice-President of Madhya Pradesh Bharatiya Janata Party twice in 1984-86 and 1995–96.

In 2005, she was inducted in Babulal Gaur’s cabinet a Minister for Women & Child Development and Revenue and retained her position in the Shivraj Singh Chouhan' cabinet as well.

References

Living people
Madhya Pradesh MLAs 2013–2018
1943 births
State cabinet ministers of Madhya Pradesh
People from Panna district
Bharatiya Janata Party politicians from Madhya Pradesh
21st-century Indian women politicians
21st-century Indian politicians
Women state cabinet ministers of India
Women members of the Madhya Pradesh Legislative Assembly